The 2017 Middle East Rally Championship was an international rally championship sanctioned by the FIA. The championship was contested over five events held in five Middle East countries from February to September.

Qatar's Nasser Al-Attiyah won his thirteenth MERC championship and his seventh consecutively. Al-Attiyah won three rallies over the course of the season creating a gap unable to be approached. Kuwaiti driver Meshari Al-Thefiri led the points after three rallies but was unable to score any points subsequently. Lebanese veteran Roger Feghali's one-off appearance and victory at his home event was enough to finish the year third in the championship.

Event calendar and results

The 2017 MERC was as follows:

Championship standings
The 2017 MERC for Drivers points was as follows:

References

External links

Middle East Rally Championship
Middle East
Middle East Rally Championship